Constantine v Imperial Hotels Ltd [1944] KB 693 is an English tort law and contract case, concerning the implied duty of an innkeeper to offer accommodation to a guest unless for just cause.

Facts

In 1943, Learie Constantine, a black Trinidadian professional cricketer who had played for the West Indies but lived in the UK, travelled to London to play for the Dominions team against England at Lord's. He and his family had a reservation to stay at the Imperial Hotel, London in Russell Square; he had been assured that he and his family would be welcomed and treated with the utmost respect. When they arrived at the hotel however, they were informed they could stay only one night on account of complaints about their presence made by white American military servicemen who were also staying at the hotel. According to a newspaper report, the receptionist said "we won't have niggers in this hotel".

They were treated as outcasts, and Constantine was outraged. He claimed the hotel was in breach of contract. In Britain there was no statute that expressly outlawed racial discrimination. Constantine claimed that the hotel committed a tort, deriving from the common law principle that innkeepers must not refuse accommodation to guests without just cause.

Judgment

Mr Justice Birkett held that a right of Constantine had been violated. It was accepted that an innkeeper had a duty to provide reasonable accommodation and rejected the contention that when the hotel offered to lodge Constantine elsewhere, it was fulfilling that duty. Furthermore, even though Constantine suffered no pecuniary damage, the violation of the right was in principle capable of justifying a remedy. He was awarded the small sum of five guineas in damages.

Significance
The ruling did not end the colour bar in some British hotels and other public establishments. Constantine later wrote Colour Bar (1954). The book dealt with racial prejudice in Britain. In 1947, Constantine was appointed as a Member of the Order of the British Empire. The Hotel Proprietors Act 1956 extended the law against discrimination in statute to all hotels, also those offering food and drink. But it was not until after the Civil Rights Act of 1964 in the USA that the Labour Party committed to a general statute against racial discrimination with the passage of the Race Relations Act 1965. This was further extended to all public services and employment by the Race Relations Act 1976. The law is now found in the Equality Act 2010.

Cartoonist David Low drew one of his more famous cartoons attacking the hotel's treatment of Learie Constantine.

See also
 Equality Act 2010
 Invitation to treat
 Heart of Atlanta Motel, Inc. v. United States

References

United Kingdom labour case law
English tort case law
English contract case law
1944 in British law
1944 in case law
Hotels in London
United Kingdom civil rights case law